Help Us Stranger is the third studio album by American rock band The Raconteurs. It was released on June 21, 2019, through Third Man Records, their first studio album in 11 years following Consolers of the Lonely (2008). The album was recorded at Third Man Studio in Nashville, Tennessee, and mixed at Blackbird Studios in Nashville. It was produced by the band, engineered by Joshua V. Smith, and mixed by Vance Powell.

Promotion and release
On the tenth anniversary of the band's second studio album, Consolers of the Lonely released in 2008, Third Man announced a re-issue of the album, along with two previously unreleased songs, "Sunday Driver" and "Now That You're Gone" were released as double A-side singles. Both songs received videos, which were shot a week before the release. On April 2, 2019, the album artwork, along with its track listing and release date were announced. On April 10, "Hey Gyp (Dig the Slowness)", a cover of the Donovan song, premiered on Bandcamp. Two days later, it was also made available on other platforms. On September 5, 2019 the band performed on The Tonight Show Starring Jimmy Fallon and performed their new single "Only Child," as well as "Shine the Light on Me."

Critical reception

Help Us Stranger received favourable reviews from music critics. At Metacritic, which assigns a normalized rating out of 100 to reviews from mainstream critics, the album received an average score of 81, based on 24 reviews. Loudwire named it one of the 50 best rock albums of 2019.

Commercial performance
Help Us Stranger debuted at number one on the US Billboard 200 with 88,000 album-equivalent units, of which 84,000 were pure album sales. It was The Raconteurs' first US number-one album. It has also charted in the top ten in Canada, UK, Switzerland, the Netherlands and Belgium (Flanders region).

Track listing

Personnel
Personnel adapted from album notes.

The Raconteurs
Jack White – vocals, guitar, piano, synthesizer, production
Brendan Benson – vocals, guitar, percussion, harmonica, production
Jack Lawrence – bass guitar, guitar, synthesizer, backing vocals, production
Patrick Keeler – drums, percussion, backing vocals, production

Additional musicians
Dean Fertita – piano, synthesizers, guitar, organ
Lillie Mae Rische – violin
Scarlett Rische – mandolin
Joshua V. Smith – backing vocals, organ

Technical personnel
Michael Fahey – assistant mixing
Dusty Fairchild – assistant engineering
Vance Powell – mixing
The Raconteurs – production, mixing
Bill Skibbe – mastering
Joshua V. Smith – engineering

Other personnel
Rob Jones – design, cover art concept
Patrick Keeler – photography, design
Tristan McNatt – cover art concept
Ian Montone – management

Charts

Weekly charts

Year-end charts

References

2019 albums
The Raconteurs albums
Albums produced by Jack White
Third Man Records albums